Ofori Panin Senior High School (OPASS) is a co-educational second cycle institution at Kukurantumi in the Eastern Region of Ghana.
Ofori Panin School (formerly Tafo-Kukurantumi Senior High school, now nicknamed OPASS), is a co-educational boarding school located at Tafo in Akyem, Eastern Region, Ghana. The school was founded in 1961 by Kwame Nkrumah. The foundation stone of the building was laid on 19 May 1962 by Hon. Kofi Asante Ofori Attah, M.P. for Akim Abuakwa and Minister of Justice at that time. An alumnus/alumna of Ofori Panin is known as an "Opassian".

The motto of the school is "Dwen Na Som" meaning "Think and Serve", a reference to the founders' expressed philosophy that starting in the context of school life, male and female, everyone should serve with a thoughtful mind and be ready and willing to serve yourself, your school, family, nation and the world at large. The school crest was designed using the leopard and other items. The leopard signifies strength and intelligence, a torch, which shows light and brightness on the path to victory, a cutlass that represents the farming community of Akim Abuakwa, a tree signifying the rain forest of Akyem Abuakwa which provides fertile land for the production of timber and cocoa, the backbone of Ghana's economy.

Principals and heads

Notable alumni 
Dorothy Yeboah-Manu, microbiologist and professor at the Noguchi Memorial Institute for Medical Research at the University of Ghana.
Justice Julius Ansah, Supreme Court judge.
Patrick Darko Missah, Director General of the Ghana Prisons Service.
Kwakye Darfour, Ghanaian politician and a member of the New Patriotic Party in Ghana.
Xbills Ebenezer, music video director, and filmmaker.
Nii Amasah Namoale, Ghanaian Politician.

References 

Schools in Ghana
Boarding schools in Ghana
Education in the Eastern Region (Ghana)
Educational institutions established in 1961
1961 establishments in Ghana